Westrehem is a commune in the Pas-de-Calais department in the Hauts-de-France region of France.

Geography

It is surrounded by the communes of Ligny-lès-Aire, Fontaine-lès-Hermans and Febvin-Palfart. Westrehem is located 16 km northwest of Bruay-la-Buissière, the largest nearby city.

Heraldry

Population

Places of interest
 The church of St.Joseph, dating from the nineteenth century.
 The war memorial.

See also
Communes of the Pas-de-Calais department

References

External links

 Unofficial commune website 

Communes of Pas-de-Calais